Wilson-Conococheague is a census-designated place (CDP) in Washington County, Maryland, United States. The population was 2,262 at the 2020 census.

Geography

Demographics

At the 2000 census, there were 1,885 people, 718 households and 549 families living in the CDP. The racial make-up of the CDP was 97.82% White, 1.06% African American, 0.05% Native American, 0.42% Asian, 0.21% from other races and 0.42% from two or more races. Hispanic or Latino of any race were 0.58% of the population.

There were 718 households, of which 35.9% had children under the age of 18 living with them, 63.0% were married couples living together, 9.5% had a female householder with no husband present and 23.5% were non-families. 18.4% of all households were made up of individuals and 8.6% had someone living alone who was 65 years of age or older. The average household size was 2.63 and the average family size was 2.98.

25.9% of the population were under the age of 18, 6.0% from 18 to 24, 32.6% from 25 to 44, 22.9% from 45 to 64 and 12.6% were 65 years of age or older. The median age was 36 years. For every 100 females, there were 97.6 males. For every 100 females age 18 and over, there were 93.8 males.

The median household income was $38,389 and the median family income was $39,256. Males had a median income of $31,505 and females $21,250. The per capita income was $15,951. About 5.6% of families and 7.4% of the population were below the poverty line, including 2.9% of those under age 18 and 15.6% of those age 65 or over.

References

Census-designated places in Washington County, Maryland
Census-designated places in Maryland